Rocket Languages Ltd is an online language learning company founded in 2004 by Jason Oxenham and Mark Ling.

Language courses 
Rocket Languages offers 26 courses in 13 languages. All courses are web-based, do not require extra software installation and are compatible with Mac and PC.

Course access is provided via an online portal that requires a login, either on desktop or through an iOS or Android app. Members have lifetime access to their purchased materials which can be download for offline use.

Courses provide a variety of lessons in speaking, writing, listening, reading and culture. Other learning tools include voice recognition technology, interactive tests, personalized word lists, flashcards and motivational features.

Languages offered include Spanish, Sign Language, Russian, Portuguese, Korean, Japanese, Italian, Hindi, German, French, English, Chinese, Arabic, Inglés (English for speakers of Spanish), and 英語 (Eigo; English for speakers of Japanese).

History 
When founded in 2005, Rocket Languages was self funded but became profitable after 12 months, after which revenue was reinvested back into developing new language courses.

Rocket Languages first developed Rocket Spanish, a Latin American Spanish course, followed by Rocket French, a French language course.

, Rocket Languages has courses in 15 different languages.

Reception 
In 2009, Rocket Languages had over 70 thousand customers of which more than half were American learners over 35 years of age. Rocket Languages courses are sold internationally to over 90 countries, with the main demographic being the United States, Britain and Canada.

, Rocket Languages has 1.2 million users worldwide.

Awards 
 2008 Ranked 34th in the Deloitte/Unlimited Fast50 index in 2008
 2008 Ranked 303 Deloitte Technology Fast 500 Asia Pacific 2008 Ranking and CEO Survey in 2008

References

External links 

Language-learning websites
New Zealand educational websites